Me Too, Flower! is a 2011 South Korean television series, starring Lee Ji-ah and Yoon Shi-yoon in lead roles, and a supporting cast led by Han Go-eun, Seo Hyo-rim, Jo Min-ki, and Lee Gi-kwang. It aired on MBC from November 9 to December 28, 2011 on Wednesdays and Thursdays at 21:55 for 15 episodes.

Plot
The series follows the relationship of an abrasive female police officer and a millionaire masquerading as a parking attendant.

Cast
Lee Ji-ah as Cha Bong-sun
Kim Sung-kyung as young Cha Bong-soon
Yoon Shi-yoon as Seo Jae-hee
Han Go-eun as Park Hwa-young
Seo Hyo-rim as Kim Dal
Jo Min-ki as Park Tae-hwa
Lee Gi-kwang as Jo Ma-roo and Pink Chicken
Lee Byung-joon as Team Leader Kim
Im Ha-ryong as Bae Sang-eok
Jung Man-sik as Kim Do-kyun
Baek Seung-hee as Lee Young-hee
Kim Ji-sook as Kim Do-mi
Gi Ju-bong as Dispatch chief
Kim Ik as Sergeant Kang
Kim Jong-pil as Sergeant Ko
Hong Hyun-taek as Han Ah-in
Son Il-kwon as Manager Lee
Jung Soo-young as drunk woman (cameo)
Lee Chung-mi as (cameo)
Ma Dong-seok as detective (cameo)
Park Ki-woong as Bong-sun's ex-boyfriend (cameo)
Heo Ga-yoon as high school student (cameo)

Production
Kim Jaewon was originally cast in the leading role of Seo Jae-hee. But on the first day of filming on October 4, 2011, he was injured when the moped he was riding malfunctioned and accidentally accelerated. After being diagnosed with a dislocated shoulder, bone fracture and torn ligaments and cartilage, he withdrew from the drama and was replaced by Yoon Shi-yoon.

Ratings

International broadcast
 It aired in Japan on cable channel KNTV from July 26 to September 13, 2012, and terrestrial network TBS beginning September 3, 2012.
 It aired in Vietnam on HTV7 from October 4, 2014, under the title Tình cuồng si.
 It aired in Malaysia on TV9 from January 4, 2016.

References

External links
Me Too, Flower! official MBC website 

Flower, I Am at MBC Global Media

Korean-language television shows
2011 South Korean television series debuts
2011 South Korean television series endings
South Korean romantic comedy television series
MBC TV television dramas